The Municipal History Museum of Écija is a history museum in Écija, Spain, mainly dedicated to archaeology.

History 
Hosted at the Benamejí Palace, an instance of the local Baroque architecture, the museum is owned by the municipality and operated by a municipal foundation. It began operation in November 1997. The first archaeology section opened in 1999. The museum joined the regional register of museums of Andalusia in 2000.

Pieces 
Among the items exhibited at the museum, standout collections include the set of Roman mosaics from Astigi (one of the largest from Hispania), Roman sculpture (including the iconic wounded amazon), the anthropologic collection from the Late antiquity and the Al-Andalus period, the Roman epigraphy, a number of warrior stelae and the pre-Roman Écija Plaque found in the surrounding campiña.

References 
Citations

Bibliography
 
 

Archaeological museums in Spain
Écija
Local museums in Spain
History museums in Spain
Museums in Andalusia
Museums of ancient Rome in Spain